is a Japanese actress.

Yamamura is represented by Misa Yamamura Office and Toho Entertainment. She is a graduate of Kyoto University of Education Kindergarthen, Elementary School, Junior High, and High School and Waseda University Political Science and Economics. Yamamura's mother was Misa Yamamura and her husband is a former Ministry of Finance bureaucrat. Her uncle is Hiroshi Kimura. Yamamura's hobby is ice skating. Her skills are speaking English, German, and Kyoto words and playing the piano.

Filmography

TV drama

NHK

Nippon TV

Tokyo Broadcasting System

Fuji Television

TV Asahi

TV Tokyo

Films

Travel series

Anime

Advertisements

Stage

Radio

Games

Dubbing
Murder on the Orient Express, Princess Dragomiroff (Judi Dench)

Bibliography

Books

References

External links
Misa Yamamura Office official website 
 

1960 births
Living people
Actresses from Kyoto
20th-century Japanese actresses
21st-century Japanese actresses